Stepping Out is an album by American guitarist Steve Laury released in 1990, and recorded for Denon Records. Stepping Out is Laury's first solo album, and his first album after leaving the group Fattburger. The album reached #14 on Billboard's Contemporary Jazz chart.

Track listing
Stepping Out (Steve Laury) - 4:35
All Because of You (Steve Laury / Ron Satterfield) - 5:40
Kiss Me Goodbye (Steve Laury) - 4:44
Soulful Eyes (Steve Lauty / Ron Satterfield) - 4:21
Just Like An Angel (Steve Laury) - 4:40
Walk Your Talk (Steve Laury / Ron Satterfield) - 5:26
Mañana (Steve Laury) - 5:59
Shakedown (Steve Laury / Ron Satterfield) - 3:55
The Day She Went Away (Steve Laury) - 3:05

Personnel
Steve Laury - guitar
Ron Satterfield - keyboards, vocals
Duncan Moore - drums, percussion
Kevin Hennessey - bass
Rob Whitlock - keyboards, bass
John Rekevics - saxophone, flute

Charts

References

External links
Stepping Out at CD Universe
Stepping Out at AllMusic
Steve Laury plays Soulful Eyes at YouTube

1990 albums
Denon Records albums